Frank William Erickson (September 1, 1923 – October 21, 1996) was an American composer, conductor, arranger, writer, and trumpet player.

Growing up 
The son of Frank O.. Myrtle Erickson, Frank Erickson was born and raised in Spokane, Washington. He began his instrumental career at the age of eight, playing piano, and at age ten, playing trumpet. In high school, he wrote his first composition for the band, The Fall of Evening.
 World War II
At age nineteen, World War II began. He then served with the United States Army Air Forces from 1942 to 1946. He worked as a weather forecaster and also arranged music for several army bands.

 Post World War II
After the war, Erickson worked as a jazz arranger, namely for Earle Spencer and His Orchestra (1946); and he played trumpet. He also studied composition with Mario Castelnuovo-Tedesco during this time period.

As he wrote the music and studied composition, Frank Erickson developed an interest in getting a degree and eventually enrolled at University of Southern California to further his studies in composition. While there, he began arranging half-time shows for the USC marching band. By the time he graduated, he had many published band compositions. His very first was called Little Suite for Band. He graduated from USC with a Bachelor of Music degree in 1950. The next year he went back to USC and graduated again with a Master of Music degree in 1951.  His master thesis was about his own music.

 Family
In 1953, Erickson married Mary Theresa McGrorty. They had three sons: William Erickson, Richard Erickson, Christian Erickson. Mary Theresa McGrorty died in 1975 at the age of 53 years. On August 15, 1981, he married Mary Ann Smith.

 Career in higher education
Erickson lectured at University of California, Los Angeles, in 1958. He then became a professor of music at San Jose State University.  The 1950s were prolific years for Erickson. His publications of works such as Balladair, Air for Band, Fantasy for Band, and Toccata for Band were quickly popular and led to wide notability in the concert band world. He is also widely known for his book Arranging for the Concert Band, namely by college music majors.

 Motivation
At the time many pieces for the band were extremely difficult or not great pieces. Erickson loved his students so much he wrote a collection of pieces including Air for Band to expand the band repertoire.

 Publishing career
For a number of years, Erickson worked in a publishing company, but years later he became an entrepreneur. He began his own publishing business called Frank Erickson Publications in 1995.

 Affiliations
Erickson was a longtime member of the National Band Association, was elected to the Academy of Wind and Percussion Arts in 1986, was a member of American Society of Composers, Authors and Publishers, was a member of the Phi Mu Alpha Sinfonia, the Pi Kappa Lambda, the Phi Beta Mu, and the American Bandmasters Association.

 Erickson Collection at Old Dominion University
In 2000, Erickson's widow, Mary Ann Smith, donated all of his compositions to Old Dominion University, which included over 400 works, 200 of which are originals.
 Frank Erickson Collection, Old Dominion University

Selected works
 Original compositions
 Balladair (1958); 
 Blue Ridge Overture  (1976)
 Air for Band (1956); 
 Fantasy for Band (1955); 
 Toccata for Band (1957); 
 The Fall of Evening (1940)
 Little Suite for Band (1951); 
 Allegro Animato (1991); 
 English Folk-Song Fantasy
 Fanfare for a Festival
 Lyric Suite
 Lyric Episode (1991)
 Aria Cantabile (1990); 
 Overture Jubiloso (1978); 
 Irish Folk Song Suite (1952); 
 Arietta And Rondo (1961); 

 Arrangements
 Barcarolle, by Jacques Offenbach (1964); 
 Suite of Early Marches,  Arr. by Frank William Erickson (1972);

Selected audio 
 "Air," North Texas Wind Symphony
 "Toccata"
 "Pillars of the Earth"
 "Overture Jubiloso," Tokyo Kosei Wind Orchestra
 "Black Canyon of the Gunnison" (1954) De Pauw University Band

References 
General references
 Biography at The Wind Repertory Project
 66 Festive & Famous Chorales for Band (1st trombone part), arranged by Frank Erickson, Alfred Publishing (1991)
 Biography, Musquodoboit Rural High School
 The ASCAP Biographical Dictionary, New York
 Third edition (1966)
 Fourth edition (1980)
 Biography Index; A cumulative index to biographical material in books and magazines, Volume 10: September 1973 – August 1976, H. W. Wilson Company, New York (1977)
 Contemporary American Composers, A biographical dictionary, First edition, compiled by E. Ruth Anderson, G.K. Hall & Co., Boston (1976)
 Contemporary American Composers. A biographical dictionary. Second edition. Compiled by E. Ruth Anderson. Boston: G.K. Hall & Co. (1982)
 The Heritage Encyclopedia of Band Music, Composers and their music, two volumes, by William H. Rehrig, Integrity Press, Westerville, OH (1991)
 The New Grove Dictionary of American Music, four volumes, edited by H. Wiley Hitchcock and Stanley Sadie, Macmillan Press, London (1986)
 Composium Directory of New Music, Annual index of contemporary compositions, 1982/83 edition, Crystal Musicworks, Sedro Woolley, WA (1983)
 International Who's Who in Music and Musicians' Directory, International Who's Who in Music, Cambridge, England
 Eighth edition, (1977)
 Ninth edition, edited by Adrian Gaster (1980)
 10th edition (1984)
 12th edition, 1990–1991. (1990)
 Who's Who in America, Marquis Who's Who
 40th edition, 1978–1979, Wilmette, IL (1978)
 41st edition, 1980–1981, Wilmette, IL (1980)
 42nd edition, 1982–1983, Wilmette, IL (1982)
 43rd edition, 1984–1985, Wilmette, IL (1984)
 44th edition, 1986–1987, Wilmette, IL (1986)
 45th edition, 1988–1989, Wilmette, IL (1988)
 46th edition, 1990–1991, Wilmette, IL (1990)
 47th edition, 1992–1993, New Providence, NJ (1992)
 48th edition, 1994, New Providence, NJ (1993)
 49th edition, 1995, New Providence, NJ (1994)
 50th edition, 1996, New Providence, NJ (1995)
 51st edition, 1997, New Providence, NJ (1996)
 Who's Who in Entertainment, Second edition, 1992-1993, Marquis Who's Who, Wilmette, IL (1992)
 Who Was Who in America, Volume 12, 1996-1998, Marquis Who's Who, New Providence, NJ (1998)

Inline citations

American male composers
American music arrangers
University of California, Los Angeles faculty
San Jose State University faculty
Musicians from Spokane, Washington
1923 births
1996 deaths
20th-century American composers
20th-century American male musicians
Earle Spencer Orchestra members
United States Army Air Forces personnel of World War II
University of Southern California alumni